Richard Münch (born 13 May 1945 in Niefern near Pforzheim, Germany) is a German sociologist and, as of 2013, professor emeritus at the University of Bamberg. His primary field is sociological theory, in particular the work of Talcott Parsons. In the 1980s, he was instrumental in popularizing Parsons in Germany and defended his functionalist "grand theory" of action against competing approaches, such as rational choice and Niklas Luhmann's systems theory, which had been gaining ground since the 1970s.

In the late 1980s, Münch spent several months each year as a visiting professor at the University of California, Los Angeles; his courses there formed the basis for a three-volume English-language textbook on sociological theory.

In the 1990s and 2000s, Münch's work diversified, and he focused more strongly on empirical studies on cultural, political and economical topics ranging from the impact of mass communication to globalization and European integration. More recently, his focus has been on current developments and reforms in the German system of higher education, of which he is a vocal public critic.

Selected works in English 
The Micro-Macro Link. Berkeley, CA: University of California Press, 1987 (edited with Jeffrey C. Alexander, Bernhard Giesen, and Neil J. Smelser)  
Theory of Action. Towards a New Synthesis Going Beyond Parsons. London: Routledge & Kegan Paul, 1987
Understanding Modernity. Towards a New Perspective Going Beyond Durkheim and Weber. London: Routledge & Kegan Paul, 1988
Theory of Culture. Berkeley, CA: University of California Press, 1992 (edited with Neil J. Smelser)
Sociological Theory I. From the 1850s to the 1920s. Chicago: Nelson Hall, 1994
Sociological Theory II. From the 1920s to the 1960s. Chicago: Nelson Hall, 1994
Sociological Theory III. Development Since the 1960s. Chicago: Nelson Hall, 1994
Democracy at Work. A Comparative Sociology of Environmental Regulation in the United Kingdom, France, Germany, and the United States. Westport, Conn.: Praeger Publishers (Greenwood Press), 2001 (with Christian Lahusen, Markus Kurth, Cornelia Borgards, Carsten Stark and Claudia Jauß)
The Ethics of Modernity. Formation and Transformation in Britain, France, Germany and the United States. Lanham, MD: Rowman & Littlefield, 2001
Nation and Citizenship in the Global Age. From National to Transnational Civil Ties. Houndsmills, Basingstoke, London: Palgrave (MacMillan), 2001
European Governmentality. The Liberal Drift of Multilevel Governance. London: Routledge, 2010
Inclusion and Exclusion in the Liberal Competition State: The Cult of the Individual. London: Routledge 2012

References

External links 
 Personal page at Bamberg University with links to CV and complete list of publications, retrieved 27 October 2020

1945 births
Max Weber
German sociologists
Heidelberg University alumni
Living people